This is a list of prime ministers, including those of the Joseon and the Korean Empire, from when the first Korean prime minister (in the modern sense) took office in 1895, and during the early years of being under Japanese rule until 1910.

List of prime ministers of Korea

See also
 List of presidents of the Provisional Government of the Republic of Korea
 List of prime ministers of North Korea
 List of prime ministers of South Korea

References

Lists of prime ministers by country
Prime Ministers
 

id:Daftar Perdana Menteri Korea Selatan#Perdana Menteri Selama Masa Kerajaan (1895-1910)